You Better Move On may refer to:

You Better Move On (album), by Billy Craddock, 1972
"You Better Move On" (song), originally recorded by Arthur Alexander, 1961